Saint Glastian of Kinglassie (or Glastianus, Glascianus; died 830) was a bishop based in Fife who acted as a mediator in the wars between the Picts and the invading Scots.
His feast day is 28 January.

Heritage

The church in Kinglassie, which belonged to Dunfermline Abbey, was dedicated to Saint Glastian.
It was near to St. Glastian's Well.
It is quite possible that the surname M'Glashan comes from Glastian.

Monks of Ramsgate account

The monks of St Augustine's Abbey, Ramsgate wrote in their Book of Saints (1921),

Forbes's account

Alexander Penrose Forbes (1817–1875) in his Kalendars of Scottish Saints wrote,

Butler's account

The hagiographer Alban Butler (1710–1773) wrote in his Lives of the Fathers, Martyrs, and Other Principal Saints under January 28,

Notes

Sources

 
 

 

Medieval Scottish saints
830 deaths